The Oblivion law was an 1821 Argentine law promulgated by Martín Rodríguez, governor of the Buenos Aires province. It was promoted by his minister Bernardino Rivadavia, and set a general amnesty to all the people guilty of treason. During the Argentine War of Independence, many governments had taken such measures against their political enemies and exiled them; this law allowed them to return to Buenos Aires free of charges. The law said that:

Juan Larrea, Carlos María de Alvear, Manuel Dorrego and Manuel de Sarratea, among others, could return to Argentina because of this law.

References

Legal history of Argentina
1821 in law
1821 in Argentina
Argentine War of Independence